Paraswada tehsil is a fourth-order administrative and revenue division, a subdivision of third-order administrative and revenue division of Balaghat district of Madhya Pradesh.

Geography
Paraswada tehsil has an area of 590.53 sq kilometers. It is bounded by Balaghat tehsil in the southwest, west and northwest, Mandla district in the north and northwest, Baihar tehsil in the east and southeast and Kirnapur tehsil in the south.

See also 
Balaghat district

Citations 

Tehsils of Madhya Pradesh
Balaghat district